The following is a list of notable events that are related to Philippine music in 2014.

Events

January
 January 15: Filipino caregiver Rose Fostanes from Taguig wins the inaugural season of The X Factor Israel, after performing "My Way".

February
 February 14: The revived local version of MTV in the country, MTV Pinoy was relaunched. Sam Pinto, Andre Paras, singer Josh Padilla, and Yassi Pressman were also introduced as the channel's VJs.

March
 March 19: President Benigno Aquino III led the opening of the first Pinoy Music Summit organized by Organisasyon ng mga Pilipinong Mang-aawit (OPM), Filipino Society of Composers, Authors and Publishers, Inc. (FILSCAP), Philippine Association of Recording Industry (PARI), Assosasyon ng Musikong Pilipino Foundation Inc. (AMP), Music Copyright Administrators of the Philippines (MCAP) and PHILPOP Foundation at the Landbank Plaza in Manila. Aquino III said in his speech that he will continue to support the Original Pilipino Music (OPM) industry through the implementation of the Executive Order 255 by former President Corazon Aquino that orders local radio stations to air at least four OPM songs per hour.
 March 20: The 12 finalists for the year's Philippine Popular Music Festival were announced.
 March 26: The music video of "Magda", a collaboration song of Gloc 9 and Rico Blanco was awarded Favorite Music Video at the Myx Music Awards 2014 held at the Samsung Hall of SM Aura Premier. Sarah Geronimo was named Favorite Artist of the Year. Parokya ni Edgar, who celebrated their 20th anniversary in the local music scene, was this year's Myx Magna Awardee.

April
 April 8: 
 The finals of the 2014 myx VJ Search was held at the Alphonse Bistro in Pasig. Singer Luigi D' Avola, fresh graduate Vieo Lopez and former Magic 89.9 radio jockey Gianna Llanes were the newest VJs of myx.
 Spotify, a free music streaming website and smartphone app based in Sweden, launched for Philippine online and mobile users.

May
 May 1: Rocky Rosabal, a service crew member from a McDonald's branch in Cagayan de Oro, was proclaimed as the 1st runner-up of the fifth season of the Voice of Mcdonald's held at Orlando, Florida.
 May 8: Music Deserves Respect (MDR) Live, was the first silent and less-noised concert in Philippine music industry using Sony's newest headphones featuring Ely Buendia and Bamboo Mañalac. It was held at the Rockwell Tent in Makati.
 May 27: Sarah Geronimo were among the acts that won accolades in the 2014 World Music Awards held in Monaco, winning the Best Selling Philippines Artist award. Geronimo is the first Filipino music artist to receive an award in World Music Awards history.

June
 June 23: The 15 finalists for the year's Himig Handog P-Pop Love Songs were announced.

July
 July 11: 1st MOR Pinoy Music Awards, held at the SM Mall of Asia Arena in Pasay, coincides with the first anniversary of MOR 101.9 For Life!.
 July 26: The 3rd Philippine Popular Music Festival was held in which "Salbabida" won the Grand Prize. It was composed by Jungee Marcelo and interpreted by Kyla.
 July 27: Lyca Gairanod, coached by Sarah Geronimo, won the inaugural season of The Voice Kids at the Resorts World Manila.

September
 September 23: "May Awa ang Dios", composed by Louise Lyle Robles and interpreted by Beverly Caimen was crowned as the winning entry in the 2014 A Song of Praise Music Festival Finals Night held in the Smart Araneta Coliseum.
 September 28: "Mahal Ko O Mahal Ako", composed by Edwin Marollano and interpreted by KZ Tandingan was proclaimed as Grand Winner in the 2014 Himig Handog P-Pop Love Songs Finals Night held in the Smart Araneta Coliseum.

November
 November 23: Brother Zachary Dominguez who represented Asia won the Binhi category, Sister Cris Ann Julique Fabilona who represented the Philippines won the KADIWA category, Sister Loryza Francisco who represented Europe won the Buklod category and Brother Dean Angelina who represented the Philippines won the CWS or PNK category in the Grand finals night of Iglesia ni Cristo's Songs of Faith, Love, & Hope: International Singing Competition held in Philippine Arena.
 November 30: Star Music releases Jamie Rivera's "We Are All God's Children", the official theme song for Pope Francis' apostolic visit to the Philippines in January 2015.

December
 December 16: Herbert Colangco, one of the New Bilibid Prison's inmate whose cell was raided by authorities on Monday, shot a music video inside his luxurious quarters in the jail facility.

Debuts

Soloist
 Myk Perez
 Paolo Onesa
 Janice Javier
 Klarisse de Guzman
 Herbert C.
 Maja Salvador
 Rose Fostanes
 Azrah
 Kylie Padilla
 Hannah Nolasco
 Enchong Dee

Bands/groups
 Iktus
 Batchmates
 Blaze N Kane
 Generation

Disbandment
 Baywalk Bodies

Albums released
The following albums are released in 2014 locally. Note: All soundtracks are not included in this list.

Awards
 March 26: Myx Music Awards 2014 , organized by myx
 June 11: 2014 Urban Music Awards, organized by Wave 89.1
 July 11: 1st MOR Pinoy Music Awards organized by MOR 101.9
 September 14: 6th Star Awards for Music, organized by Philippine Movie Press Club
 December 12: 27th Awit Awards, organized by the Philippine Association of the Record Industry

Concerts and music festivals

 January 11–12: Capital Cities: live at Ayala Malls
 January 17: The Bootleg Beatles: live at the PICC Plenary Hall
 January 18: 
 The Bootleg Beatles: live at the SMX Davao Convention Center
 Sitti Navarro live at the Music Museum
 Lea Salonga's Playlist: The Repeat live at the PICC Plenary Hall
 January 19: The Bootleg Beatles: live at the Grand Ballroom, Solaire Resort & Casino
 January 20: Frankie Valli and the Four Seasons: live at the Newport Performing Arts Theater, Resorts World Manila
 January 21: Phoenix: live at the World Trade Center
January 29–30: Boublil and Schönberg's Do You Hear the People Sing? benefit concert live at the Newport Performing Arts Theater, Resorts World Manila
 February 1: David Pack Live in Manila 2014 at the Grand Ballroom, Solaire Resort & Casino
 February 2: Dream K-Pop Fantasy Concert 2 featuring Super Junior-M, BTOB, Block B, A-Jax, BAP, and A-Prince: live at the Smart Araneta Coliseum
 February 6: Periphery Live in Manila at SM Skydome
 February 7: 
 Bamboo Mañalac and Yeng Constantino: By Request concert live at the Waterfront Cebu City Hotel & Casino
 Freestyle and Crib live at Bagaberde 101, Boom na Boom Complex
 February 7–8: My Bloody Valentines at the Scream Park Manila
 February 8: Jed Madela: Love in the Island: A Valentine Concert with Jed Madela at the Tejeros Grand Ballroom, Island Cove Hotel and Leisure Park
 February 9: It's All About Love: Golden Voices, Golden Hearts at the Tanghalang Aurelio Tolentino, CCP Complex
 February 12: 
 Rufa Mae Quinto and Gladys Guevarra: No Husband, No Lover: A Funny Valentine Concert at the Music Museum
 Juris and Chester John at the Bagaberde 101, Boom na Boom Complex
 February 13: 
 Valentine Serenades: Bo Cerrudo and Robert Seña at the Grand Ballroom, Solaire Resort & Casino
 Mogwai and Warpain live at the Metrotent Convention Center (part of the FebFest 2014: Hostess Club Manila concert)
 February 13–14: 
 Jack Jones: A Valentine Concert live at the Smart Araneta Coliseum and the Manila Hotel Tent
 The Circus Band and The New Minstrels: We Got the Love The Greatest Hits Reunion live at the PICC Plenary Hall
 February 13–15: Ogie Alcasid: Samahang Walang Ka-Valentine live at the Music Museum
 February 13–16: Kuwerdas ng Pagkakaisa: Philippine Rondalla Festival live at the Tanghalang Aurelio Tolentino, Cultural Center of the Philippines
 February 14: 
 Martin Nievera and Regine Velasquez: With Love, Martin & Regine at the SM Mall of Asia Arena
 Julia Fordham Love Moves: Julia Fordham Live in Manila at the Solaire Resort & Casino
 Russell Thompkins Jr. and the New Stylistics Live in Manila at Isla Grand Ballroom, Edsa Shangri-la
 Leo Valdez and Kuh Ledesma: The King and the Diva Beyond Classic at the Newport Performing Arts Theater, Resorts World Manila
 Michael Johnson: A Night of Love and Music with Michael Johnson at the Fontana Hot Springs Leisure Parks, Pampanga
 Hotdog: A Valentine Concert... Pakagat Pa Nga! at The Library, Metrowalk Plaza
 Reo Brothers of Tacloban at the Armada Hotel Manila
 February 14–15: My Bloody Valentines at the Scream Park Manila
 February 15: 
 Russell Thompkins Jr. and the New Stylistics Live in Manila at Resort World Manila
 The Circus Band and The New Minstrels: We Got the Love The Greatest Hits Reunion live at the SMX Davao Convention Center
 February 16: The Ultimate Valentines with Dan Hellix and Rex Smith at the Solaire Grand Ballroom, Solaire Resort & Casino
 February 17: Avril Lavigne live at the Smart Araneta Coliseum
 February 20: The National and Youth Lagoon live at the Metrotent Convention Center (part of the FebFest 2014: Hostess Club Manila concert)
 February 21: Freestyle and Crib live at Bagaberde 101, Boom na Boom Complex
 February 22: 
 Miss Rachelle – A Send Off Concert at the Meralco Theater
 My Bloody Valentines at the Scream Park Manila
 February 22–23: 7107 International Music Festival at Global Gateway Logistics City, Angeles City featuring Red Hot Chili Peppers, Kaskade, Empire of the Sun, Kendrick Lamar, The Asteroids Galaxy Tour, The Red Jumpsuit Apparatus, Natives, DJ Riddler, Reid Stefan
 February 27 – March 3: Malasimbo Music & Arts Festival 2014 Live at Puerto Galera
 February 28: Jonalyn Viray: Fearless concert Live at the Music Museum
 March 4: Earth Wind & Fire Experience with Al McKay Live in Manila at the Solaire Resort & Casino
 March 8: 
 Mayday Parade Live in Manila at SM Skydome
 Bamboo Mañalac and Yeng Constantino: By Request concert live at the University of Southeastern Philippines Gym
 March 11: Incognito Live in Manila at the Solaire Resort and Casino
 March 15: Sam Concepcion: No Limitations concert live at the Music Museum
 March 16: 
 Bamboo Mañalac and Yeng Constantino: By Request concert live at the University of Baguio
 Macklemore & Ryan Lewis: World Tour 2014 live at the SM Mall of Asia Arena
 Solaire Turns One: Jessica Sanchez in Concert Live at the Solaire Resort and Casino
 March 19: Il Divo: A Musical Affair at the Newport Performing Arts Theater, Resorts World Manila
 March 21: ABBAmania Live in Manila 2014 at the Solaire Resort and Casino
 March 22: Bruno Mars: The Moonshine Jungle Tour live at the SM Mall of Asia Arena
 March 27–28: Passion Manila 2014 at the Smart Araneta Coliseum
 March 28: Tony Hadley: Live in Manila 2014 at the Solaire Resort & Casino
 March 28–29: The 1975 Live at the Ayala Malls
 March 29: Renee Olstead: Summertime Tour Live at the Isla Grand Ballroom of the EDSA Shangri-la Hotel
 March 29–30: Barney's Birthday Bash Musical Concert at the SM Mall of Asia Arena
 April 4: 
 Throwback Giveback: Side A, Ryzza Mae Dizon and Nyoy Volante's Benefit Concert for the I-Help Foundation at the Aliw Theater
 “80s Throwback Concert” Dance Party featuring When in Rome Live at the Solaire Resort & Casino Grand Ballroom
 April 5: 
 Lionel Richie – All the Hits, All Night Long Tour Live at the Smart Araneta Coliseum
 Close Up Forever Summer Music Festival (with DJ Alesso, Denizkoyu, Helena) at Circuit Event Grounds, Makati
 April 8: 
SenyorROCK featuring Pepe Smith, Wally Gonzales, Sampaguita, Resty Fabunan & Lolita Carbon Live at the Hard Rock Cafe Makati 
Moonpools and Caterpillars concert live at the Amber Ultra Lounge, The Fort Strip, Bonifacio Global City.
 April 9: 
Jimmy Needham Live in Manila at the CCF Center
Moonpools and Caterpillars concert live at the Outpost, Cebu City.
 April 11–12: Arise: Gary V. 3.0 30th Anniversary Concert Live at the Smart Araneta Coliseum
 April 13: Michael Gungor and Jars of Clay Live in Manila at the Bonifacio Global City
 April 25: Earth Day Jam 2014 at the Bonifacio Global City, Taguig.
 April 26: 
 Pulp Summer Slam 2014: Children of the Damned at the Amoranto Stadium
 Summer Myx Fest 2014 with Kamikazee, Rico Blanco and DJ Tom Taus at the Bama Grill & Restaurant, Station 1, Boracay, Aklan.
 April 30
 DOS: The Daniel Padilla Concert Live at the Smart Araneta Coliseum
 The Pretty Reckless Live in Manila at the Samsung Hall, SM Aura Premier
 May 3: ABS-CBN Philharmonic Orchestra Spotlight Series: The Music of Ryan Cayabyab @ Tanghalang Nicanor Abelardo, Cultural Center of the Philippines Complex 
 May 6: Earl Klugh Live in Manila at the PICC Plenary Hall
 May 9: The Righteous Brothers' Bill Medley and The Platters Live in Manila at the Solaire Resort & Casino
 May 12: Children of Bodom Live in Manila at the SM SkyDome, SM City North Edsa
 May 14: The Cascades and the Classics IV with Kyle Vincent concert live at the Solaire Resort & Casino 
 May 15: 
 Berta Rojas Live in Manila at the Meralco Theater
 The Teeth: The Reunion Concert Live at Metrowalk, Ortigas Center, Pasig
 May 16: 
 Anne Curtis in The Forbidden Concert: Round 2: Anne-Kapal Live at the Smart Araneta Coliseum
 Jazzified: KZ Tandingan & Markki Stroem concert Live at the Music Museum
 May 17: 
 2NE1: World Tour 2014: All or Nothing live at the SM Mall of Asia Arena
 Before You Exit Live in Manila at the Samsung Hall, SM Aura Premier
 Wanderland Music and Arts Festival @ Globe Circuit Event Grounds, Makati
 Berta Rojas Live in Cebu 
 Rock & Soul: Jovit Baldivino & Thor Live at the Music Museum
 May 28: 
Village People Live in Manila at the Solaire Resort & Casino
 May 29: Village People Live in Cebu at the Waterfront Hotel & Resort Cebu
 May 30: 
Bigfish Live Presents: Armin Van Buuren Intense Tour @ Manila at the SM Mall of Asia Arena
Village People Live in Davao at the SMX Convention Center, SM Lanang Premier Davao
 June 3: Extreme Live in Manila
 June 5: Vertical Horizon Live in Manila at the Newport Performing Arts Theater, Resorts World Manila
 June 6: Taylor Swift RED Tour Live in Manila at the SM Mall of Asia Arena 
 June 7:
Pulp Live World presents We The Kings Live in Manila @ SM SkyDome, SM City North Edsa
Lee Eun Mee Live in Manila @ Resorts World Manila
 June 11: Bone Thugz-N-Harmony Live in Manila at the Mall of Asia Arena.
 June 13: Hillsong United Live in Manila at the Smart Araneta Coliseum
 June 14: Indie Jam 2014 Live at the A. Venue Open Ground, Makati
 June 20: China Crisis Live in Manila at the Solaire Resort and Casino
 June 26: Icona Pop Live in Manila at the Raven Boutique Club, Bonifacio Global City, Taguig.
 June 28: Gerald Santos, It's Time Concert at the SM SkyDome, SM City North EDSA
 June 29: Digimon Super Megaforce Fusion Live at MOA Arena
 July 9: Tony Orlando Live at the Newport Performing Arts Theater, Resorts World Manila
 July 14: Jessie J Live at the Smart Araneta Coliseum
 July 24:
 ABS-CBN Philharmonic Orchestra Spotlight Series featuring Andrew Santos at the Meralco Theater, Pasig.
 Disclosure live at the World Trade Center
 July 25: I Heart You 2!: Be Careful with My Heart 2nd Year Anniversary & Thanksgiving Concert at the Smart Araneta Coliseum, Quezon City.
 August 2:
 Arise: Gary V. 3.0 30th Anniversary Concert The Repeat Live at the Mall of Asia Arena.
 John Ford Coley live at the Solaire Resort and Casino
 August 8: The Dawn: Landmarks Live at the Music Museum
 August 31: Bazooka Rocks III Live at the SMX Convention Center, SM Mall of Asia
 September 6: B1A4 live at the Smart Araneta Coliseum.
 September 12: David Blaine live at the Smart Araneta Coliseum
 September 17: Boyz II Men Live at the Smart Araneta Coliseum.
 September 19:
 Callalily: Happy Together concert at the Music Museum
 CNBlue Can't Stop Tour 2014 live at the Smart Araneta Coliseum.
 September 26: John Legend: The All of Me Tour Live in Manila 2014 at the Smart Araneta Coliseum.
 October 1: 
 Shane Filan You and Me Tour live at the World Trade Center.
 Hardwell live in Manila at the Mall of Asia Arena.
 October 3: 
 Toni Gonzaga Concert live at the Mall of Asia Arena
 Neverland Manila live at the Mall of Asia Concert Grounds.
 October 5: KNation Music Showcase 2014 live at the Mall of Asia Arena
 October 22: Magic Live at the Resorts World Manila.
 October 28: Mariah Carey: Me, I Am Mariah World Tour live at the Mall of Asia Arena
 November 5: The 2014 Clean Air Concert live at the Fairview Terraces
 November 21: ICON The Concert with Rico Blanco, Gloc-9 and Yeng Constantino live at the Smart Araneta Coliseum
 November 27: Jason Mraz and Raining Jane Live at the Smart Araneta Coliseum.
 December 13: Julie Anne San Jose Hologram Concert live at the Mall of Asia Arena

No definite schedule
 Megadeth Live in Manila 2014 at the World Trade Center (Initially scheduled on March 7 but was cancelled and moved to a yet to be announced date)

Cancelled dates
 January 29: Selena Gomez Stars Dance Tour live at the Smart Araneta Coliseum.
 July 28: The Lumineers Live in Manila 2014 at the World Trade Center.
 November 29: Celine Dion Asia 2014 Tour live at the Mall of Asia Arena.

References

 
Philippines
Music
Philippine music industry